Ko Chang-seong (Hangul: 고창성, Hanja: 高昌成; born December 21, 1984 in Seoul, South Korea) is a sidearm pitcher playing for the NC Dinos in the KBO League. He bats and throws right-handed.

Professional career
Ko played college baseball at Kyungsung University in Busan. He was drafted by the Doosan Bears in the 3rd round (20th overall) of the  Korea Baseball Organization Draft.

After the 2010 season, Ko was selected for the South Korean national baseball team to compete in the 2010 Asian Games where he won the gold medal.

In , Ko earned 14 holds but his ERA rose to 4.44. In , he finished the season with an 8.62 ERA losing all ability to control his pitches. Ko was sent down to the second-tier team of the Bears in the middle of the 2012 season and traded to the NC Dinos after the season.

References

External links 
 Career statistics and player information from Korea Baseball Organization

NC Dinos players
Doosan Bears players
KBO League pitchers
South Korean baseball players
Baseball players at the 2010 Asian Games
Asian Games medalists in baseball
Baseball players from Seoul
Kyungsung University alumni
Living people
1984 births
Asian Games gold medalists for South Korea
Medalists at the 2010 Asian Games